The official flag of the city of Grand Forks, North Dakota, was adopted on December 5, 1994.

Design 
The flag features green riverbanks (symbolize the life and growth of the city), blue water (symbolizes the forking of the Red River of the North and the Red Lake River at Grand Forks and the historical significance of the rivers in the development of the city), a yellow stalk of wheat (symbolizes the local importance of agriculture), a red feather (symbolizes the influence of Native Americans on the region), and a white background (symbolizes the clean air and open spaces of the area). 1870 refers to the year the name "Grand Forks" was first applied to the new community.

References

Flag

Flags of cities in North Dakota
1994 establishments in North Dakota
Flags introduced in 1994